Asura elegans is a moth of the family Erebidae first described by Reich in 1937.

References

elegans